Ezekiel 27 is the twenty-seventh chapter of the Book of Ezekiel in the Hebrew Bible or the Old Testament of the Christian Bible. This book contains the prophecies attributed to the prophet/priest Ezekiel, and is one of the Books of the Prophets. This chapter contains a lamentation for the fallen city of Tyre.

Text
The original text was written in the Hebrew language. This chapter is divided into 36 verses.

Textual witnesses

Some early manuscripts containing the text of this chapter in Hebrew are of the Masoretic Text tradition, which includes the Codex Cairensis (895), the Petersburg Codex of the Prophets (916), Aleppo Codex (10th century), Codex Leningradensis (1008).

There is also a translation into Koine Greek known as the Septuagint, made in the last few centuries BC. Extant ancient manuscripts of the Septuagint version include Codex Vaticanus (B; B; 4th century), Codex Alexandrinus (A; A; 5th century) and Codex Marchalianus (Q; Q; 6th century).

Verse 2
 "“Now, son of man, take up a lamentation for Tyre" (NKJV)
 "Son of man" (Hebrew: בן־אדם -): this phrase is used 93 times to address Ezekiel.

The people of Tyre, seeing themselves as the great merchants, will have a great downfall despite their past glory.

Verse 3a
and say to Tyre, which sits at the entrance to the sea, merchant of the peoples on many coastlands ...
The word for "entrance" or "gateway" is literally "entries" (plural), "reference possibly being to the two harbours of Tyre, one of which was to the north east of the island, called the Sidonian harbour, because looking towards Sidon, and the other on the south or south-east of the island, the exact position of which is uncertain owing to the silting which has taken place". Ancient Tyre was on an island, which is now connected to the mainland by a causeway.

See also

Related Bible parts: Genesis 10, Joshua 13, Isaiah 23, Ezekiel 26, Revelation 18

Notes

References

Bibliography

External links

Jewish
Ezekiel 27 Hebrew with Parallel English
Ezekiel 27 Hebrew with Rashi's Commentary

Christian
Ezekiel 27 English Translation with Parallel Latin Vulgate

27
Phoenicians in the Hebrew Bible